Petra Dode was an Albanian Politician. 

She was appointed Chairperson of the State-Planning Committee in the Council of Ministers in 1972.

References

20th-century Albanian women politicians
Albanian communists